The Undertaker is a nickname of:

 Mark William Calaway (born 1965), American professional wrestler
 Bill Baker (Canadian football) (born 1944), Canadian retired football player
 Vincent Brown (linebacker) (born 1965), American former National Football League player and current college coach
 Johnny Cash (1932–2003), American singer-songwriter, actor and author, early in his career
 Stefano Magaddino (1891–1974), Sicilian mafioso who became the boss of the Buffalo crime family in western New York
 Kevin Thomas (darts player) (born 1980), Welsh darts player
 Chris Walsh (American football) (born 1968), American retired National Football League player

See also 

Lists of people by nickname